The Black Camel is a 1931 American pre-Code mystery film directed by Hamilton MacFadden and starring Warner Oland, Sally Eilers, Bela Lugosi, and Dorothy Revier. It is based on the 1929 novel of the same name by Earl Derr Biggers. It is the second film to star Oland as detective Charlie Chan, and the sole surviving title of the first five Chan films starring Oland. The Black Camel marked the film debut of Robert Young.

Plot
Movie star Shelah Fayne is making a picture on location in Honolulu, Hawaii. She summons mystic adviser Tarneverro from Hollywood to help her decide whether to marry wealthy Alan Jaynes, a man she has  known for only a week. Her friend Julie O'Neil worries, however, that the famous psychic has too much influence over Fayne. Meanwhile, Julie has fallen in love herself with local publicity director Jimmy Bradshaw.
  
Honolulu Police Inspector Chan pretends to be a humble merchant, but Tarneverro sees through his impersonation. Chan mentions to him the yet unsolved murder of film star Denny Mayo, committed years before.

Then Jimmy finds Shelah's body; she has been murdered. Julie makes him remove Shelah's ring before calling for the police.

Chan investigates. He invites Tarneverro to assist him. Tarneverro reveals that Shelah told him she was in love with Denny and was responsible for his death, but kept quiet to protect her career.

The suspects are many, but after various startling revelations, Chan eventually identifies the killer and the connection to Danny Mayo's death.

Cast
Warner Oland as Inspector Charlie Chan
Sally Eilers as Julie O'Neil
Bela Lugosi as Tarneverro / Arthur Mayo
Dorothy Revier as Shelah Fane
Victor Varconi as Robert Fyfe, Shelah's ex-husband
Murray Kinnell as Archie Smith
Robert Young as Jimmy Bradshaw
Violet Dunn as Anna
J.M. Kerrigan as Thomas MacMasters
Mary Gordon as Mrs. MacMasters
Rita Rozelle as Luana
Otto Yamaoka as Kashimo
Dwight Frye as Jessop (uncredited)
Hamilton MacFadden as Val Martino (uncredited)

Other
The film further reunited Lugosi with Dwight Frye (playing Jessop, the butler), who had appeared with him in Dracula in the same year. C. Henry Gordon, who had been in Warner Oland's first (lost) Chan film and would show up in three more Chan films with both Oland and the later Chan Sidney Toler, appears uncredited as Huntley Van Horn.

The small but crucial role of Anna the housekeeper was played by stage actress Violet Dunn, the wife of director Hamilton MacFadden.

Production
Much of the picture was shot on location in Honolulu, with several scenes filmed at the renowned Royal Hawaiian Hotel. The opening beach scene was filmed at Kailua Beach.

References

Bibliography
 Hanke, Ken, Charlie Chan at the Movies: History, Filmography, and Criticism, McFarland & Company Publishers, Jefferson, North Carolina, and London, 1989, .

External links

1931 films
American crime thriller films
American black-and-white films
Charlie Chan films
American detective films
Films based on mystery novels
Films directed by Hamilton MacFadden
Films set in Hawaii
Films based on American novels
Films with screenplays by Dudley Nichols
Fox Film films
American mystery thriller films
1930s crime thriller films
1930s mystery thriller films
1930s American films
1930s English-language films